Barış Hamaz (born 29 March 1976 in Karabük) is a Turkish volleyball player. He is 200 cm. He plays for Fenerbahçe Men's Volleyball Team since 2007 season start and wears number 6. He played 15 times for national team. He also played for Erdemirspor, SSK.

External links 
 Player profile at fenerbahce.org

References

1976 births
Living people
Turkish men's volleyball players
Fenerbahçe volleyballers